The 2006 British GT season consisted of a fourteen-round series of sports car racing in the British GT Championship. The season consisted of two 2-hour enduros at Donington Park and Silverstone, with 4 other double 1 hour-race events held in England, 2 in France (held alongside the FFSA GT Championship) and 1 in Ireland. It was contested by GT2 cars, the renamed GT3 class (now GTC), and a new GT3 class conforming with new FIA regulations. This would be the last year of competition for GT2 cars, with very low grids and thus half points being awarded at most races. The following year, GT3 became the main class, with GTC supporting.

Calendar

 The Pau and Magny-Cours rounds were also both run as rounds of the FFSA GT Championship. At Pau, only GT3 and GTC cars competed; at Magny-Cours, only GT2 cars competed. FFSA GT Championship participants were ineligible for British GT championship points.

Championship standings

Drivers' Championships

GT2

 Half points awarded where less than 6 cars start (Rounds 1, 6-13, 15, 16)

GT2 Teams Standings

GTC

† — Drivers did not finish the race, but were classified as they completed over 90% of the race distance.

GT3

 Half points awarded where less than 6 cars start (Rounds 4-7, 10-13)

All information sourced from https://web.archive.org/web/20090813160841/http://zeta.britishgt.com/points.php?season=2006&class=GT2&type=driver&event=1 and other areas of this site.
NOTE: Championship Standings based on race results, not given standings (they do not appear to correspond)

References

External links
British GT website

British GT Championship seasons
GT Championship